kaMalandela is a South African Zulu surname. Notable people with the surname include:

Ntombela kaMalandela ( 1590– 1655), 17th century proto-chieftain of the Zulu nation
Zulu kaMalandela (1627–1709), founder and chief of the Zulu clan

Surnames of African origin